Riverdale Baptist School is a private Christian school located in Upper Marlboro, Maryland, serving students from Pre-K to 12. It is located in Prince George's County, Maryland, and is accredited through Middle States Association of Colleges and Schools and the Association of Christian Schools International.

History

Riverdale Baptist School was founded in 1971 as a daughter ministry of Riverdale Baptist Church under the leadership of Reverend Fitzpatrick. The first year, RBS had an enrollment of 188 students in kindergarten through the sixth grade and was renting facilities from a local Catholic school. With the school growing at a rapid pace, 156 acres on Largo Road in Upper Marlboro, MD was purchased in 1974. The 70,000 square foot educational building opened in 1975 with the 2300 seat church sanctuary following shortly thereafter. Over the years, RBS has added a basketball and volleyball gymnasium featuring a weight room and film room, baseball and softball diamonds, and lastly the RBS SportsPlex. The RBS SportsPlex features a regulation 8-lane track with an artificial turf football/soccer field with seating for 500+ and a grass practice field.

Programs
Riverdale Baptist School is in its 5th year of offering a 1:1 technology program, featuring Apple laptops (high school) and iPads (middle and elementary school) for each student. There are also dedicated computer labs for elementary, middle and high school featuring Apple computers and Dell monitors. The campus features state-of-the-art WiFi to ensure that all students are able to access cloud resources effectively throughout the school day. The tech initiative allowed RBS to be one of the only schools in the tri-state area to continue to educate its students without interruption when the COVID-19 outbreak occurred in early 2020.

The elementary program at Riverdale Baptist School emphasizes spiritual precepts, character building, and the skills and concepts necessary to academic advancement. These self-contained classrooms follow a carefully selected curriculum of learning in Bible, language skills, spelling, reading, math, handwriting, science and heritage studies.

The middle school program emphasizes strong academics as well as an expanding Fine Arts program. The school day consists of a Bible class, four academic classes (math, history, science, English), physical education, and one elective.

Riverdale Baptist high school program emphasizes a college preparatory curriculum with honors and advanced placement courses offered to academically qualified students. Over 50% of the high school student body maintains a 3.0 GPA in an intensive academic program that includes developing solid Christian character. On average, 98% of the schools seniors are accepted into four year
colleges and universities each year.

Faculty and mission

Faculty members are all dedicated Christians who have a calling to minister in Christian Education. They have earned degrees from reputable Bible colleges, Christian colleges, and secular universities from across the nation. They are active in Church activities and ministries. Throughout the school year, days are set aside for attending conventions, conferences and in-house workshops to enrich and provide teacher development.

Mission statement: Riverdale Baptist school exists for the purpose of providing the opportunity for all students to develop a personal relationship with the Lord Jesus Christ and to receive a Christ-centered Biblically-based education.

Notable alumni
Shakira Austin, WNBA Player
Michael Beasley Professional Basketball Player
Christian Darrisaw, Professional Football Player
Olandis Gary, Professional Football Player
Zion Johnson, Professional Football Player
Jonquel Jones, WNBA Player
Zech McPhearson Professional Football Player
 Chinanu Onuaku (born 1996), basketball player
Nolan Smith, Professional Basketball Player 
Wanisha Smith, WNBA Player
Devin Sweetney, Professional Basketball Player

References

Baptist schools in the United States
Baptist Christianity in Maryland
Christian schools in Maryland
Private elementary schools in Maryland
Private middle schools in Maryland
Private high schools in Maryland
Schools in Prince George's County, Maryland
Preparatory schools in Maryland
1971 establishments in Maryland
Educational institutions established in 1971